The 41st Combined Arms Army is a field army of the Russian Ground Forces, currently part of the Central Military District. Originally, it was formed in 1942 as part of the Soviet Red Army, during World War II. It was reformed in 1998, when the Transbaikal Military District and Siberian Military District were amalgamated.

Soviet Union
The 41st army was created in May 1942, on the base of Nikolai Berzarin and German Tarasov's operational groups. Its structure also included the 134th, 135th, 179th and 234th Rifle Divisions, the 17th Guards Rifle Division, the 21st Tank Brigade, two separate Guards mortar battalions, and several other separate elements.

From May to November 1942, the army was focused on defending the South-Western approach to the city of Bely. In late November, the army joined the Rzhev offensive operation (also known as "Operation Mars"). During that time, the army was engaged with the Wehrmacht XLI Panzer Corps. The army's offensive failed, and they were surrounded by the German XXX Army Corps (Germany). By December 8, the surrounded forces were destroyed.

In March 1943, the newly reinforced 41st Army joined the Rzhev-Vyazma operation. The offensive was a success and German forces in the Rzhev-Vyazma area were annihilated. Following the operation, the forces of the army were transferred to the 39th Army and the 43rd Army, while the 41st Army itself was sent to the STAVKA reserves. On April 9, 1943, the army was disbanded and its remaining forces would form the Reserve Front.

Russian Federation 
The 41st Army was reformed on 1 December 1998 from the former headquarters of the Siberian Military District at Novosibirsk, part of the Siberian Military District. In 2002, the 122nd Guards Motor Rifle Division was relocated to Aleysk and became part of the army. During the Russian military reform in 2009, the division was converted into the 35th Separate Guards Motor Rifle Brigade. On 1 September 2010, the army was transferred to the Central Military District after the Siberian Military District was disbanded.

A dedicated electronic warfare battalion is scheduled to be formed within the 41st Combined Arms Army by the end of 2019.

2022 Russian invasion of Ukraine
In the context of the 2021 Russo-Ukrainian crisis, major elements of the 41st Army were reported to have deployed west to reinforce units in the Western and Southern Military Districts confronting Ukraine. These units were said to include elements of the 35th, 55th Mountain and 74th Guards Motorised Rifle Brigades, as well as elements of the 120th Artillery Brigade, and 119th Missile Brigade, and the 6th Tank Regiment of the 90th Tank Division. All told, some 700 MBTs, IFVs, and SPHs, as well as Iskander ballistic missile launchers were reported to have been repositioned to the west.

Starting during the early hours of February 24, 2022, elements of the 41st Army participated in the 2022 Russian invasion of Ukraine, entering from the area of tripartite border (Russia, Ukraine, Belarus) and heading towards Kyiv, forming part of the Kyiv offensive (2022). Along the general direction toward Kyiv, it is believed that the 41st Army participated in the operation to attack and occupy the working Chernobyl power station.

Major-General Andrei Sukhovetsky, the deputy chief of the 41st army, was killed during the invasion on February 28. Parts of the 41st Combined Arms Army were part of the forces fighting in the Battle of Siverskyi Donets.

Structure
June 1, 1942:

 17th Guards Rifle Division
 134th Rifle Division
 135th Rifle Division
 179th Rifle Division
 234th Rifle Division
 21st Armoured Brigade
 Separate Engineer and Artillery units

September 1, 1942:

 17th Guards Rifle Division
 134th Rifle Division
 179th Rifle Division
 234th Rifle Division
 21st Armoured Brigade
 104th Armoured Brigade
 Separate Engineer and Artillery units

December 1, 1942:

 6th Rifle Corps
 150th Rifle Division
 74th Rifle Brigade
 75th Rifle Brigade
 78th Rifle Brigade
 91st Rifle Brigade
 17th Guards Rifle Division
 93rd Rifle Division
 134th Rifle Division
 234th Rifle Division
 262nd Rifle Division
 1st Mechanized Corps
 19th Mechanized Brigade
 35th Mechanized Brigade
 37th Mechanized Brigade
 65th Tank Brigade
 219th Tank Brigade
 47th Mechanized Brigade
 48th Mechanized Brigade
 104th Armoured Brigade
 154th Armoured Brigade
 Separate Engineer and Artillery units

March 1, 1943:

 17th Guards Rifle Division
 93rd Rifle Division
 134th Rifle Division
 262nd Rifle Division
 75th Rifle Brigade
 78th Rifle Brigade
 Separate Engineer and Artillery units

2009 composition
Headquarters - Novosibirsk
85th Motor Rifle Division - Novosibirsk
122nd Guards Motor Rifle Division - Aleysk
74th Separate Motor Rifle Brigade - Yurga
many other storage bases

2016 composition
 Army Headquarters (Novosibirsk) 
 35th Separate Guards Motor Rifle Brigade (Aleysk)
 55th Mountain Motor Rifle Brigade (Kyzyl, Tuva Republic)
 7th Tank Brigade (Chebarkul Oblast) (together with the 32nd Separate Motor Rifle Brigade the 7th Tank Brigade was used to form the 90th Guards Tank Division in December 2016)
 74th Guards Motor Rifle Brigade (Yurga)
 119th Rocket Brigade (Yelansky) Brigade location now reported as Abakan in Khakassia.
 120th Guards Artillery Brigade (Yurga)
 61st Anti-Aircraft Rocket Brigade (Biysk)
 35th Headquarters Brigade (Kochenyovo)
 106th Separate Logistic Support Brigade (Yurga)
 10th Separate NBC Protection Regiment (Topchikha)

Later (at least by 2020) the 24th (Kyzyl) and the 40th Engineer-Sapper Regiments (Ishim, Tyumen Oblast) were subordinated to the army.

Commanders

Soviet formation
 Major General German Tarasov (May - December 1942)
 Major General Ivan Managarov (December 1942 -March 1943)
 Major General Iosif Popov (March - April 1943)

Russian formation
 Lieutenant General Aleksandr Morozov (July 1998 - June 2001)
 Lieutenant General Vladimir Kovrov (June 2001 - July 2003)
 Major General  (July 2003 - August 2004)
 Lieutenant General Arkady Bakhin (October 2004 - January 2006)
 Major General Aleksandr Galkin (January 2006 - April 2008)
 Major General  (May 2008 - June 2009)
 Lieutenant General  (June 2009 - October 2013)
 Major General Khasan Kaloyev (October 2013 - January 2016)
 Major General  (January 2016 - November 2018)
 Major General Yakov Rezantsev (November 2018 - August 2020)
 Major General  (August 2020 – present)

References

 41st Army
 60 лет Победы. 41-я армия
 Russian Military Analisis, warfare.ru

041
Armies of the Russian Federation